The 2016–17 Coupe de France was the 100th season of the most prestigious football cup competition of France. The competition was organised by the French Football Federation (FFF) and was opened to all clubs in French football, as well as clubs from the overseas departments and territories (Guadeloupe, French Guiana, Martinique, Mayotte, New Caledonia (winner of 2016 New Caledonia Cup), Tahiti (winner of 2016 Tahiti Cup), Réunion, and Saint Martin).

Paris Saint-Germain were the defending champions, and successfully defended their title following a 1–0 win over Angers in the final, a third consecutive win and eleventh overall, a record.

Teams

Round 1 to 6

The first six rounds, and any preliminaries, are organised by the Regional Leagues and the Overseas Territories, who allow teams from within their league structure to enter at any point up to the Third round. Teams from CFA 2 enter at the Third round, those from CFA enter at the Fourth round and those from Championnat National enter at the Fifth round.

Round 7
The 145 qualifiers from the 6th Round of the Regional Leagues are joined by the 11 qualifiers from the Overseas Territories and the 20 teams from Ligue 2.

Ligue 2

 Ajaccio
 Amiens
 Auxerre
 Bourg-en-Bresse
 Brest
 Clermont
 Gazélec Ajaccio
 Laval
 Le Havre
 Lens

 Nîmes
 Niort
 Orléans
 Red Star
 Reims
 Sochaux
 Strasbourg
 Tours
 Troyes
 Valenciennes

Regional Leagues
Figures in parenthesis indicate the tier of the French football league system the team play at.

 Alsace: 9 teams
 FC Mulhouse (4)
 FCSR Haguenau (5)
 US Sarre-Union (5)
 FC Soleil Bischheim (6)
 AS Erstein (6)
 US Oberlauterbach (6)
 FC Kronenbourg Strasbourg (6)
 SR Kaysersberg (9)
 FC Dahlenheim (10)

 Aquitaine: 6 teams
 Pau FC (3)
 Stade Montois (4)
 Bergerac Périgord FC (4)
 Genêts Anglet (5)
 FC Bassin d'Arcachon (6)
 JA Biarritz (6)

Atlantique: 8 teams
 Les Herbiers VF (3)
 SO Cholet (4)
 USSA Vertou (5)
 FC Challans (6)
 Poiré-sur-Vie VF (6)
 TVEC Les Sables-d'Olonne (6)
 Olympique Saumur FC (6)
 AC Pouzauges-Réaumur (7)

 Auvergne: 5 teams
 AS Yzeure (4)
 SA Thiers (6)
 CS Volvic (6)
 Ytrac Foot (6)
 FA Le Cendre (8)

 Lower Normandy: 4 teams
 US Avranches (3)
 US Granville (4)
 SU Dives-Cabourg (5)
 US Alençon (6)

 Burgundy: 4 teams
 CS Louhans-Cuiseaux (5)
 SC Selongey (5)
 UF Mâconnais (6)
 US St Sernin-du-Bois (6)

 Centre-Val de Loire: 4 teams
 Châteauroux (3)
 SO Romorantin (4)
 Avoine OCC (5)
 Blois Foot 41 (5)

Centre-West: 6 teams
 Limoges FC (5)
 OL St Liguaire Niort (6)
 Poitiers FC (6)
 AS Aixoise (7)
 AS St Pantaleon (7)
 UA Niort St Florent (8)

 Corsica: 2 teams
 CA Bastia (3)
 Borgo FC (5)

 Franche-Comté: 3 teams
 ASM Belfort (3)
 Besançon FC (5)
 CA Pontarlier (5)

 Languedoc-Roussillon: 5 teams
 AS Béziers (3)
 ES Paulhan-Pézenas (4)
 Olympique Alès (5)
 AS Frontignan AC (6)
 CE Palavas (6)

 Lorraine: 8 teams
 SAS Épinal (3)
 FC Lunéville (5)
 Sarreguemines FC (5)
 Jarville JF (6)
 APM Metz (6)
 FC Sarrebourg (7)
 CS Homécourt (8)
 Entente Centre Ornain (9)

Maine: 3 teams
 Le Mans FC (5)
 ES Bonchamp (6)
 Ernéenne Foot (8)

Méditerranée: 5 teams
 GS Consolat (3)
 Étoile Fréjus Saint-Raphaël (4)
 Hyères FC (4)
 FC Istres (7)
 FC Rousset-Ste Victoire (7)

 Midi-Pyrénées: 6 teams
 Rodez AF (4)
 Tarbes PF (4)
 Balma SC (5)
 Toulouse Rodéo FC (5)
 Blagnac FC (6)
 Luc Primaube FC (6)

 Nord-Pas de Calais: 13 teams
 US Boulogne (3)
 IC Croix (4)
 ES Wasquehal (4)
 Feignies Aulnoye FC (5)
 US Maubeuge (5)
 St Amand FC (6)
 US Saint-Omer (6)
 Stade Portelois (6)
 CS Avion (7)
 Olympique Marcquois (7)
 Villeneuve-d'Ascq Métropole (7)
 AS Étaples (8)
 AS Steenvoorde (10)

 Champagne-Ardenne: 4 teams
 CS Sedan Ardennes (3)
 AS Prix-lès-Mézières (5)
 Chaumont FC (6)
 SA Sézanne (6)

 Normandy: 4 teams 
 US Quevilly-Rouen (3)
 Grand-Quevilly FC (6)

 Olympique Pavillais (7)

 Brittany: 14 teams
 US Concarneau (3)
 AS Vitré (4)
 Stade Briochin (5)
 TA Rennes (5)
 Vannes OC (5)
 Saint-Colomban Sportive Locminé (6)
 US Montagnarde (6)
 Plouzané ACF (6)
 GSI Pontivy (6)
 Guipavas GdR (7)
 Ploufragan FC (7)
 Stade Pontivyen (7)
 RC Rannée-La Guerche-Drouges (7)
 ASPTT Brest (10)

 Paris Île-de-France: 11 teams
 JA Drancy (4)
 FC Fleury 91 (4)
 ES Viry-Châtillon (4)
 Sainte-Geneviève Sports (5)
 US Sénart-Moissy (5)
 Blanc Mesnil SF (6)
 AF Bobigny (6)
 Le Mée Sports (6)
 Champigny FC 94 (7)
 Claye-Souilly SF (9)
 ES Parisienne (9)

 Picardy: 7 teams
 FC Chambly (3)
 AS Beauvais Oise (5)
 US Roye-Noyon (5)
 AFC Compiègne (6)
 US Chauny (7)
 ESC Longueau (7)
 US St Maximin (7)

 Rhône-Alpes: 14 teams
 AS Lyon-Duchère (3)
 ASF Andrézieux (4)
 Grenoble Foot 38 (4)
 AS Saint-Priest (5)
 Cluses-Scionzier FC (6)
 Côte Chaude Sportif (6)
 Hauts Lyonnais (6)
 FC Rhône Vallées (6)
 FC Vaulx-en-Velin (6)
 UF Belleville St Jean-d'Ardières (7)
 FC Bords-de-Saône (7)
 AS Misérieux-Trévoux (7)
 Olympique St Marcellin (7)
 AS Savigneux-Montbrison (8)

Overseas Territories teams

 French Guiana: 2 teams
 US Matoury (DH)
 Le Geldar De Kourou (DH)

 Martinique: 2 teams
 Club Franciscain (LR1)
 Golden Lion FC (LR1)

 Guadeloupe: 2 teams
 CS Moulien (DH)
 Phare du Canal (DH)

 Réunion: 2 teams
 AS Excelsior (D1R)
 JS Saint-Pierroise (D1R)

 Mayotte: 1 team
 FC Mtsapéré (DH)

 New Caledonia: 1 team
 AS Magenta (SL)

 Tahiti: 1 team
 AS Dragon (L1)

Seventh round
The draw for the seventh round is made in two parts. First the Overseas teams are drawn against opponents from the French League structure who have applied to potentially travel overseas. Those French teams not drawn in this part are re-entered into the main draw which takes place a day later.

The matches were played on 11, 12, and 13 November 2016.

Ties involving overseas teams
The draw took place on 26 October 2016.

Main draw
The draw took place on 27 October 2016. It was split into 10 regional groups.

Group A

Group B

Group C

Group D

Group E

Group F

Group G

Group H

Group I

Group J

Eighth round
The draw for the Eighth round took place on 15 November 2016. Of the 88 teams qualifying, the lowest ranked was SR Kaysersberg (level 9). The draw for the remaining overseas team took place ahead of the main draw. AS Excelsior (D1R)  were guaranteed a home draw under the rules of the competition. The main draw was divided into 6 regional groups.

Matches took place on 2, 3, and 4 December 2016.

Overseas draw

Group A

Group B

Group C

Group D

Group E

Group F

Round of 64
The draw for the round of 64 took place on 5 December 2016. The 44 winning teams from the eighth round are joined by the 20 teams from Ligue 1. Of the 64 teams qualifying, the lowest ranked was FC Istres (level 7). The draw was divided into 4 groups which were sorted to ensure primarily that each group had an even balance of teams from different levels, and secondarily to achieve optimum geographical proximity.

Ties took place between 6 and 18 January 2017.

Group A

Group B

Group C

Group D

Round of 32
The draw for the Round of 32 was made on 8 January 2017. The lowest ranked club remaining was Poiré-sur-Vie VF (level 6). Matches took place on 31 January and 1 February 2017.

Round of 16 
The draw for the Round of 16 was made on 2 February 2017. The lowest ranked clubs remaining were Étoile Fréjus Saint-Raphaël and Bergerac Périgord FC (level 4). Matches took place between 28 February and 2 March 2017.

Quarter-finals 
The draw for the quarter-finals was made on 1 March 2017. The lowest ranked club remaining was Étoile Fréjus Saint-Raphaël (level 4). Matches took place on 4 and 5 April 2017.

Semi-finals 
The draw for the semi-finals was made on 5 April 2017. Matches took place on 25 and 26 April 2017.

Final

The final took place on 27 May 2017 at the Stade de France in Saint-Denis.

References

External links

 
France
Cup
Coupe de France seasons